Jeanine Steenkamp (born 6 November 1969) is a South African swimmer. She competed in five events at the 1992 Summer Olympics.

References

External links
 

1969 births
Living people
South African female swimmers
Olympic swimmers of South Africa
Swimmers at the 1992 Summer Olympics
Sportspeople from Bloemfontein